The 2012 Asian Men's Handball Championship was the 15th edition of the Asian Men's Handball Championship, held in Jeddah, Saudi Arabia, from 26 January to 5 February 2012. It acted as the Asian qualifying tournament for the 2013 World Men's Handball Championship in Spain.

Draw

Preliminary round
All times are local (UTC+3).

Group A

Group B

Placement 5th–10th

9th/10th

7th/8th

5th/6th

Final round

Semifinals

Bronze medal match

Gold medal match

Final standing

Awards
Most Valuable Player: 
Best Goalkeeper: 
Fair Play Award:

References

External links
www.asianhandball.org
Japan Handball Association
Results at todor66

Asian
Handball
Handball
Asian Handball Championships
January 2012 sports events in Asia
February 2012 sports events in Asia